Vaazhkai Padagu is a 1965 Indian Tamil-language drama film, directed by C. Srinivasan and produced by S. S. Vasan under Gemini Studios. The film stars Gemini Ganesan, Devika and R. Muthuraman, with S. V. Ranga Rao, K. Balaji R. S. Manohar and M. V. Rajamma in supporting roles. A remake of the studio's own Hindi film Zindagi (1964), it was released on 26 March 1965.

Plot 

A young, unemployed woman Seetha takes up stage acting as a career. A wealthy man Kannabiran is after her, and uses his henchman to kidnap her. During the attempt, Rajan and his dog rescue her and the two fall in love. Rajan is the son of a zamindar, who has a poor opinion of Seetha. However, after many hurdles, the two marry. The director of Seetha's stage troupe Gopal too is in love with her. But, she never responds. When Kannabiran is murdered. Gopal is arrested. He has an alibi – on the night of the murder, a young woman stayed with him in his house, but then he does not disclose her identity. The woman turns out to be Seetha and she gives them the evidence. One of the members of the jury is her father-in-law and complications follow with the husband leaving her and wishing to marry again. However, the truth comes out and the family is united in the end.

Cast 

Male
 Gemini Ganesan as Rajan
 Muthuraman as Gopal
 S. V. Ranga Rao as Rajan's father
 Nagesh
 T. S. Balaiah
 Manohar as Kannabiran's henchman
 Balaji as Kannabiran
 S. Rama Rao
 P. D. Sambandam
 Baby Farida
 Master Saheeth
 Honey

Female
 Devika as Seetha
 M. V. Rajamma
 Pushpavalli
 S. N. Lakshmi
 Geetanjali

Production 
Vaazhkai Padagu is the Tamil remake of Gemini Studios's own Hindi film Zindagi (1964). It was Devika's first film with the studio.

Soundtrack 
Music was by Viswanathan–Ramamoorthy and were lyrics written by Kannadasan.

Release and reception 
Vaazhkai Padagu was released on 26 March 1965, and emerged a box office success. It was the first film to be released at the theatre Nataraj, which opened on the same day. The magazines Kumudam and Ananda Vikatan wrote positive reviews, primarily praising Devika's performance.

References

External links 
 

1960s Tamil-language films
1965 drama films
1965 films
Films scored by Viswanathan–Ramamoorthy
Films set in Chennai
Gemini Studios films
Indian black-and-white films
Indian drama films
Tamil remakes of Hindi films